Milhosť ( or ; , formerly , until 1899 ) is a village and municipality in Košice-okolie District in the Kosice Region of eastern Slovakia. It is situated 21 km from Slovakia's second biggest city, Košice. Milhosť is surrounded by two neighbouring villages Kechnec and Seňa. Moreover, it is a border crossing village between Hungary (Tornyosnémeti) and Slovakia (Milhosť).

Etymology
The name comes from a Slavic personal name Milgost (see also e.g. Gemerský Milhosť, Milhosťov, Milhostice, Milhošť). It got its second name Németi (in Hungarian "German") after the arrival German colonists.

Village names:.
 1403-	Felsekysnemethy, Myglez
 1405- 	Kysnemety, Mikliz
 1415-   Kis Németi, Miglész
 1427-	Migles	       
 1512-	Kis Nemethi
 1523-	Migleznemethy
 1746-	Miglécz
 1773- 1786, 1790, 1808- Miglécz
 1863- 1902, 1920- 1938- Migléc
 1907-1913, 1938- 1945- Miglécnémeti
 1945- 1947	     	   Migléc
 1948- 1964		   Milhosť
 1964- 1985 	Hraničná pri Hornáde/border crossing village next to Hornád/ (Milhosť + Kechnec)
 1993	Milhosť (gained its independence), Migléc

History

The first historical records of Milhosť are from [1220]. At this time German colonists, who came during the years 1205-1209 A.D., were living in this area. The village had not been an independent ham in the 13th century. It was just a settlement which belonged to a village called Középnémeti. The first written record of Milhosť appears in the 14th century, which mentioned a St. Michael´s chapel from  1322,however the chapels' location is not known today. The name of the village changed over the years. It varied from Felsekysnemethy to its present form Milhosť.

Only Germans were living in this area till 1500 AD. At the beginning of the 16th century Hungarian families arrived and as a result the number of the German population decreased. There are no records of German families after 1600 AD but there was an increase in Slovak settlers. In 1720 AD the number of Hungarian and Slovak inhabitants was equal. The arrival of the first Jews began in 1787 and Romani people in the year 1850.

Coat of arms

The seal of Milhosť ioriginates from the year 1839 with the inscription "Miglécz helység petsétye 1839" (seal of the village Milhosť 1839)
The village's coat of arms, from the 1990s, was made according to the seal's pattern.

Two men can be seen on the coat of arms standing on green grass with hats on their heads. One of them is holding a flail and the other one a scythe. A share and a coulter are placed between them, which are golden coloured. A golden sun is shining between the men on red background.

The Graveyard

The Graveyard in Milhosť is divided between 3 owners: the western part belongs to the municipality, the left one to the Catholic church and the right to the Reformed church. A mortuary is part of the cemetery since 28 August 1994.

In the graveyard, there are graves with old ornamented wooden tombstones called as "gombfa". Three types of those tomb-stones were used among the Reformed: different ones for men, women and children. Catholics used wooden crosses. Stone tomb-stones also can be seen from the years 1899, 1900, 1906... 

Skulls are carved on the top of a pair of tomb stones with an opening; these are the oldest tombstones in the graveyard. Because of their condition the inscriptions on them cannot be read.
A Jewish cemetery is part of the municipality too. Not many people know about it, which is why it is not well maintained.

Geography

The village lies at an altitude of 166  metres and covers an area of 7.782 km².
It has a population of 344 people (2001).

Ethnicity
Approximately half of the population is Slovak (54.9%) in ethnicity, the other half is Magyar (41.8%) and Romani people.

Culture
The village has a public library and a petrol station.

A non-professional drama club functions in the village, associated with the CSEMADOK (Csehszlovákiai Magyar Dolgozók Kulturális Szövetsége / Czechoslovak Hungarian Workers´ Cultural Association), with around 10-15 Hungarian speaking members. A variety is performed by them each winter to entertain the villagers. A couple of the members are invited to various occasion to the neighbouring villages, to Hungarian villages as well, to perform small plays or sing.

References

External links

Villages and municipalities in Košice-okolie District